The Capotes Formation (Kic) is a geological formation of the Altiplano Cundiboyacense, Eastern Ranges of the Colombian Andes.

Etymology 
The formation was defined in 1969 by Cáceres and Etayo as a member of the Socotá Formation. The name is derived from Hacienda Capotes, southeast of Viotá.

Description

Lithologies 
Fossils of Douvilleiceras solitae, Neodeshayesites columbianus and Paracrioceras sp. have been found in the Capotes Formation.

Stratigraphy and depositional environment 
The Capotes Formation, part of the Villeta Group, overlies the Socotá and El Peñón Formations, and is overlain by the Hiló Formation. The age has been estimated to be Early Albian. Stratigraphically, the formation is time equivalent with the Simití Formation. The formation has been deposited in a quiet enclosed shallow marine environment. In terms of sequence stratigraphy, the Albian of current central Colombia experienced a transgressive to highstand sequence.

Outcrops 

The Capotes Formation is apart from its type locality along the road between Bituima and Guayabal, also found north and southeast of Viotá, and north and east of La Mesa.

Regional correlations

See also 

 Geology of the Eastern Hills
 Geology of the Ocetá Páramo
 Geology of the Altiplano Cundiboyacense

References

Bibliography

Maps

External links 
 

Geologic formations of Colombia
Cretaceous Colombia
Lower Cretaceous Series of South America
Albian Stage
Shale formations
Shallow marine deposits
Formations
Formations